

General classification

References

External links
 

Giro di Lombardia
1939 in road cycling
1939 in Italian sport